Javier Nicolás Casanova Sampayo (born 22 November 1993) is a Colombian filmmaker.  He has been member of the Colombian Academy of Cinematography Arts and Sciences since 2020.

His first feature-documentary, El Culebro: La historia de mi papá (2017), is a tribute to his father, actor Hernando Casanova.  After several screenings, it premiered on Caracol Televisión, and become one of the most watched documentary that day in Colombia.

Biography 
Nicolás Casanova was born in 1993 in Bogota, Colombia.  He is the youngest son of Colombian legendary actor Hernando Casanova and journalist Gilma Sampayo. He has four siblings: Juan Sebastián, Adriana (1970-2019), Rocío and Margarita. He studied Film and Television at the Jorge Tadeo Lozano University in Colombia.

Career 
Nicolas Casanova debuted in cinema producing, editing and directing the feature-documentary El Culebro: La historia de mi papá (2017). The film was called "A cornerstone to learn about the history of one of the most important figures on colombian television" and "A true and experienced work despite being produced by a young director" and "(Nicolas) is one of the outstanding directors from Bogotá".

Filmography 
 2017 – El Culebro: La historia de mi papá (Documentary)

 EUREKA Film Festival - World Premiere
 Festival Villa del Cine - Out of Competition
 XIX Festival de Cine de Santa Fe de Antioquia - Official Selection
 Festival de Cine de Oriente - Official Selection

Awards and recognitions 
 Outstanding directors from Bogota - Revista GO  (2018)

External links 
 Nicolas Casanova at IMDb
 Nicolás Casanova at Twitter

References 

Colombian film directors
1993 births
Living people
Jorge Tadeo Lozano University alumni
People from Bogotá